is the Japanese business custom in which Japanese companies hire new university graduates en masse.  This custom was  practiced in South Korea until a 2010 age discrimination law  banned the practice in South Korea. In 2018 the Japan Business Federation (Keidanren) announced that its 1,600 member companies, which represent a large portion of Japan's big business companies, would no longer be required to follow the custom from 2020 onwards.

Hiring practices 

In Japan, most students hunt for jobs before graduation from university or high school, seeking  one year before graduation, which will hopefully lead to  six months later, securing them a promise of employment by the time they graduate. Japanese university students generally begin job hunting all at once in their third year. 

The government permits companies to begin the selection process and give out informal offers beginning April 1, at the start of the fourth year. These jobs are mainly set to begin on April 1 of the following year. Due to this process, attaining a good position as a regular employee at any other time of year, or any later in life, is extremely difficult.

Since companies prefer to hire new graduates, students who are unsuccessful in attaining a job offer upon graduating often opt to stay in school for another year. According to a survey conducted by Mynavi, nearly 80% of job-seekers who had recently graduated from university had difficulty applying for entry-level positions in Japan. This is in contrast to other countries, where companies do not generally discriminate against those who have recently graduated.

By contrast, potential employees in Japan are largely judged by their educational background. The prestige of the university and high school that a student attends has a marked effect on their ability to find similarly sought-after jobs as adults.

Large companies in particular (e.g. those listed in Nikkei 225), prefer to hire new graduates of prestigious universities "in bulk" to replace retiring workers and groom in-house talent, and the numbers can vary widely from year to year. Employers tend to hire a group of people in a mechanical fashion every year. One example is Toyota; the company hired over 1,500 new graduates in 2010, but this number was barely half of the number employed the year before, and Toyota announced its intention to cut new hires in 2011 further down to 1,200. The company may offer more jobs later on, but those who missed out on the current round of hiring will have a slim chance of gaining a position because they will be overshadowed by fresh graduates.

This practice leaves thousands of young Japanese sidelined in extended studies, part-time jobs, or on unemployment benefits instead of fully participating in the domestic economy and contributes to producing a great number of freeters and NEETs in Japan.

According to the nonprofit group Lifelink's survey conducted in July, 2013, one in five Japanese college students thought about committing suicide during the job-hunting process.

The shūkatsu system is under strain due to Japan's shrinking population and competition from foreign and nontraditional companies.

Criticism 
This custom has been seen to cause many social problems in modern Japan. Students who do not reach a decision about their employment before graduating from university often face great hardships searching for a job after the fact, as the majority of Japanese companies prefer to hire students scheduled to graduate in the spring. In recent years, an increasing number of university seniors looking for jobs have chosen to repeat a year to avoid being placed in the "previous graduate" category by companies. Under the current system, Japanese companies penalize students who study overseas or have already graduated.

Reiko Kosugi, a research director at the Japan Institute for Labor Policy and Training, criticized this process in a 2006 essay in The Asia-Pacific Journal, saying, "If business is in a slump at the point of one's graduation and he cannot get a job, this custom produces inequality of opportunity, and people in this age bracket tend to remain unemployed for a long time." Nagoya University professor Mitsuru Wakabayashi has stated, "If this custom is joined to permanent employment, it produces closed markets of employment, where outplacement is hard, and the employees tend to obey any and all unreasonable demands made by their companies so as not to be fired." 

Yuki Honda, a professor at the University of Tokyo's Graduate School of Education, has said  "Whether they get a job when they graduate decides their whole life". Ken Mogi, a Japanese brain scientist, points out that limiting job opportunities would lead to a human rights issue and that Japanese companies cannot secure non-traditional competent people in the current job hunting system.

The strictness of the "recruit suits" (リクルートスーツ), hairstyles, and even employers' demands on how a recruit may sit has been criticized as sexist. Non-binary and transgender individuals also criticize the process, as it does not allow for gender variance.

Shūshoku katsudō (Japanese: 就職活動), which is abbreviated to Shūkatsu (就活),  starts in  April  and ends  during the  hiring season each year from August to October. Japanese university students who fail to receive  a job offer often must wait a year to repeat the process competing against the following year's graduating students, and those graduates are referred to as shūshoku rōnin (就職浪人), borrowing the term for a masterless samurai. The stress involved has been cited as a factor in suicide in Japan.

See also

Japanese work environment
Salaryman
Suicide in Japan
Jaesusaeng

References

External links 

  Japan's New Recruits: Victims of the Japanese-Style Family and Japanese-Style Employment
 Bleak Economy, Japanese Students Grow Frustrated With Endless Job Hunt
 More universities allowing students to delay graduation due to job shortage
 Japanese Graduates Finding Few Jobs
 Ph. D.’s in Japan can’t find work: Little recognition for high expertise, says Mainichi Communications Survey
 Economic and Social Data Rankings (Freedom of choice in life)
 Hiring practices in Japan
 Once drawn to U.S. universities, more Japanese students staying home
 Japan offers a lifetime job, if hired right out of school
 Japanese jobseekers hold Tokyo pep rally

Graduate recruitment
Japanese culture
Employment in Japan